Hill High School may refer to:

Hill High School, a former school in Newcastle, Australia
Hill High School, a former school for African Americans in LaFayette, Georgia
Andrew P. Hill High School in San Jose, California
The Hill School in Pottstown, Pennsylvania